Madurta railway station was located on the Adelaide-Wolseley line serving the Adelaide Hills suburb of Aldgate to the east of the Cricklewood Road level crossing. It was located 34.1 km from Adelaide station.

History 
It is unclear when the station was opened. It consisted of one 67 metre platform with a waiting shelter. The shelter shed was not located on the platform, instead being located between the platform and the level crossing. 

The station closed on 23 September 1987, when the State Transport Authority withdrew Bridgewater line services between Belair and Bridgewater. Both the platform and shelter shed were removed around 1994 when the line had gauge-convertible concrete sleepers installed in readiness for conversion from broad to standard gauge the following year.

References

South Australian Railways Working Timetable Book No. 265 effective 30 June 1974

Disused railway stations in South Australia
Railway stations closed in 1987
1987 disestablishments in Australia